Shalako is a 1968 British-German-American Western film directed by Edward Dmytryk and starring Sean Connery and Brigitte Bardot. It was shot at Shepperton Studios near London with sets designed by the art director Herbert Smith. Location shooting took place in Almería in southern Spain, particularly in the Tabernas Desert which was frequently used in European westerns during the decade.

The cast also includes Stephen Boyd, Jack Hawkins, and Honor Blackman, Connery's co-star in Goldfinger. It is based on a 1962 novel of the same title by Louis L'Amour. It was the first in a trilogy of L'Amour adaptions from Euan Lloyd.

Plot 
In 1880 in New Mexico, frontier adventurer Bosky Fulton (Stephen Boyd) and his men lead a hunting party of European aristocrats and their servants, along with a retired American politician and his wife, into Apache territory. When a French countess, Irina Lazaar (Brigitte Bardot), wanders off, she is attacked by Apache warriors on horseback. She is rescued by Shalako (Sean Connery), a former U.S. Cavalry officer with a personal interest in keeping non-Indians off Indian land. While on the way to returning her to the hunting party, they are surrounded by Apaches. They both promise the Apache chief they will get the outsiders off the land. The chief agrees, but his son, Chato (Woody Strode), tells Shalako he intends to kill him in battle.

Shalako urges the leader of the hunting party, Frederick von Hallstatt (Peter van Eyck), to leave, but he refuses and the two men soon despise each other. Shalako rides off to get the army to escort the party off Apache land, but the Apaches attack and would overrun the party but for a smoke signal ruse of Shalako from some distance away.

The devious Fulton takes advantage of the lull in the fighting; he and his men take the hunting party's main stage coach, plus all the weapons and supplies, leaving the hunting party at the mercy of the Apaches. Lady Julia Daggett (Honor Blackman), seeing the hopeless situation of the party, decides to leave her husband, the pathetic Sir Charles Daggett (Jack Hawkins), and go along as Fulton's lover. She and Fulton had previously teased each other in a sexually fraught manner.

Shalako returns to the stranded hunting party, which is re-equipped with weapons and supplies he had previously advised them to hide in reserve. He hopes to lead them on foot to a plateau where they will be temporarily safe. Shalako and von Hallstadt continue to feud, but over time their feelings evolve to mutual respect.

The Apaches attack the stage coach, killing all Fulton's men as well as Lady Julia. Fulton, having watched her killing, joins up with the hunting party. After they rebuff an initial Apache attack, the humiliated Sir Charles challenges Fulton, and they fatally shoot each other.

Chato and some other Apache warriors come up behind the Europeans, catching them by surprise. Chato challenges Shalako to a one-on-one fight with spears. Chato loses and is about to be killed when his father, the Apache chief, intervenes. He gives safe passage to Shalako and the others in return for his son's life. Chato storms off, feeling disgraced. With the surviving members of the party safe, Shalako rides off into the western landscape, accompanied by Countess Irina.

Cast
 Sean Connery as Moses Zebulon 'Shalako' Carlin  
 Brigitte Bardot as Countess Irina Lazaar  
 Stephen Boyd as Bosky Fulton  
 Jack Hawkins as Sir Charles Daggett  
 Peter van Eyck as Baron Frederick von Hallstadt  
 Honor Blackman as Lady Julia Daggett  
 Woody Strode as Chato (Apache chief)  
 Eric Sykes as Mako  
 Alexander Knox as Sen. Henry Clarke  
 Valerie French as Elena Clarke
 Julián Mateos as Rojas  
 Don "Red" Barry as Buffalo  
 Rodd Redwing as Chato's Father

Production 
Producer Euan Lloyd was introduced to Louis L'Amour, author of numerous Western adventure novels, by his actor friend Alan Ladd. Over the years, as Lloyd dreamed of becoming an independent producer, he kept in touch with L'Amour. He wanted to film his 1962 novel Shalako.

At one time, Lloyd had lined up Henry Fonda and Senta Berger to star in the film, planning to shoot it in Mexico. Lloyd recounted that, at the time, many film distributors were reluctant to back a film starring Fonda, and increases in the cost of filming in Mexico made it impossible to pursue.

During a meeting with L'Amour, Lloyd recounted long lines at the cinemas in New York City for the latest James Bond adventure film. L'Amour remarked that Sean Connery, who starred in the role, would certainly "look tall in the saddle". When Lloyd met Sean Connery and discussed the work with him, he learned that Connery was a Western fan since childhood. He was also keen to do the film as he had been promised $1 million and % of the profits out of the $5 million budget. Connery was available, as he had turned down playing Bond in On Her Majesty's Secret Service.

Lloyd obtained that film's planned original co-star Brigitte Bardot, Bond cinematographer Ted Moore, and Bond stuntman and action scene arranger Bob Simmons.

Bardot was paid $400,000 plus 12.5% of the profits.

Once Lloyd had Connery on board, many European and other film distributors were keen to finance the film. Distributors in 35 different countries agreed to provide promissory notes worth $5 million payable on delivery of the film. This enabled Lloyd to raise the $3 million necessary to start production and to sign Connery and Bardot. $1,455,000 came from ABC in the US, with $2 million from elsewhere. Dimitri de Grunwald became involved in helping finance.

Shooting
The film was shot in Almería, Spain. Whilst scouting locations when planning to film in the United States, Lloyd had noticed that many Native Americans were overweight. He did not think they looked menacing enough. Simmons recruited a "war party" of lean and mean Romani people (gypsies), whom he trained to ride and act like war-bent Apaches.

Simmons talked Connery into shaving off the droopy moustache which he had grown for the historic period. The investors perhaps remembered Gregory Peck's moustache in The Gunfighter, which was believed to have discouraged some of the public from attending. They feared the same might happen with Shalako.

Almería province was a favoured location for filming spaghetti Westerns. But, when Shalako was in production, Harry Saltzman's Second World War film, Play Dirty, set in North Africa, was being filmed on the same locations. One film crew had to wipe out the tyre tracks in the sand before filming the Old West, whilst the other had to pick up the horse droppings before shooting the Second World War battles. Once the gypsy Apaches, mounted on horseback, rode by mistake headlong into an attack on a Long Range Desert Group.

Lloyd gathered a strong international cast, including Connery's former co-star Honor Blackman from Goldfinger, as well as Jack Hawkins, Stephen Boyd, Woody Strode, Peter van Eyck, Alexander Knox, Eric Sykes, and Don Barry. At this stage in his career Hawkins had lost his once-booming voice to throat cancer, his voice was dubbed by others.

Connery and Bardot got on well during filming and both enjoyed the experience of making the film.

Critical response 
The film premiered in late 1968 to mixed reviews. Some critics thought the film was not as good as the other Westerns being made in Europe, in particular, the Italian westerns (known as "spaghetti Westerns") by which Sergio Leone, Lee Van Cleef, and Clint Eastwood were building their reputations.

Censorship
Two scenes are routinely cut when the film is shown on television: the death of the cowboy sent to protect Bardot's character; and the rape and death of Honor Blackman's character.

Box office
Shalako was the 18th most popular film of 1969. It recorded admissions of 1,385,466 in France and 1,272,933 in Spain and 4,200,000 in Italy. Shalako was hugely successful in Britain and on the Continent, though it made little profit. According to Variety, because of its high costs the film recorded a loss for ABC of $1,275,000.

Home media
Shalako  has been released in many territories on VHS and DVD, and in 2017 was released on Blu-ray from Kino Lorber in the US.

Notes

External links 
 
 

1968 films
1960s English-language films
English-language German films
1960s historical films
1968 Western (genre) films
British historical films
German historical films
West German films
British Western (genre) films
Films directed by Edward Dmytryk
Films based on American novels
Films based on Western (genre) novels
Films set in New Mexico
ABC Motion Pictures films
Films based on works by Louis L'Amour
Films shot in Almería
Films set in the 1880s
Bavaria Film films
Films shot at Shepperton Studios
1960s British films
1960s German films